Sant'Elia, Elia being the Italian name for the prophet Elijah, may refer to:

Places in Italy:
 Sant'Elia a Pianisi, a commune in the Province of Campobasso
 Castel Sant'Elia, a commune in the Province of Viterbo
 Sant'Elia Fiumerapido, a comune in the Province of Frosinone
 Sant'Elia (Rieti), a frazione of Rieti
 Sant'Elia (L'Aquila), a frazione of L'Aquila
 Sant'Elia (Santa Flavia), a frazione of Santa Flavia in the Province of Palermo

Places outside Italy

 Mount Saint Elias a peak in North America climbed in the 19th century by the Duke of Abruzzi.

People:
 Sant'Elia di Enna (829–904), an Italian monk from Enna, venerated as a saint in the Catholic and Orthodox churches
 Sant'Elia Speleota (863–960), an Italian saint from Reggio Calabria,  venerated in the Catholic and Orthodox churches
 Antonio Sant'Elia (1888–1916), an Italian architect from Como

Structures:
 Basilica di Sant'Elia, a church dating from the 11th century at Castel Sant'Elia
 Stadio Sant'Elia, a football stadium in Cagliari, Italy

See also 

 Monte Sant'Elia (disambiguation)